Bury Castle may refer to the following places in England:

Bury Castle, Brompton Regis, Somerset
Bury Castle, Greater Manchester
Bury Castle, Selworthy, Somerset

See also
Berry Castle (disambiguation)
Bury (disambiguation)